Slingshot Hip Hop is a 2008 documentary film directed by Jackie Reem Salloum that traces the history and development of hip hop in the Palestinian territories from the time DAM pioneered the art form in the late 1990s. It braids together the stories of young Palestinian artists living in Gaza, the West Bank, and inside Israel as they discover hip hop, and employ it as a tool to surmount divisions imposed by occupation and poverty.

Featured artists
Featuring artists; 
DAM (Tamer Nafar, Suhell Nafar and Mahmoud Jreri)
Palestinian Rapperz (Mohammed Alfarra aka Prince Alfarra, Motaz Alhwehi aka Mezo, and Mahmoud Fayad aka Kan'aan)
WEH Crew (Alaa Bishara, Ady Krayem and Anan Kseem)
MWR
Mahmoud Shalaby
Ibrahim Abu Rahala
Female artists Arapeyat, Abeer Alzinaty, Nahwa Abed Al 'Al and Safaa Hathout.

Screenings and awards
The film premiered at the 2008 Sundance Film Festival, was later shown on the Sundance Channel, and has won over 13 awards. It has shown in film festivals around the world, including International Documentary Film Festival Amsterdam, ND/NF, Stockholm International Film Festival, Sensoria Music & Film Festival, Bonnaroo Music Festival, DOX BOX Syria, Dubai International Film Festival, Beirut International Film Festival, Boston Palestine Film Festival.

In August 2008 Slingshot Hip Hop was shown to Palestinian youth in three of Lebanon's Palestinian refugee camps: Shatila, Bourj al-Barajneh, and Beddawi.

See also
Palestinian hip hop
 List of Palestinian films

References

External links
 
 

2008 films
2008 documentary films
2008 independent films
American documentary films
American independent films
Palestinian documentary films
Palestinian independent films
Palestinian music
Documentary films about hip hop music and musicians
2000s American films